HMS Jersey was a J-class destroyer of the Royal Navy.

Construction and career
On 25 March 1937, the British Admiralty placed orders for the eight destroyers of the J class, including one ship, Jersey to be built by J. Samuel White and Company at Cowes on the Isle of Wight. Jersey was laid down on 20 September 1937 and launched on 26 September 1938. Jersey was commissioned on 28 April 1939.

Following commissioning, Jersey worked up at Portland through to July 1939. On 12 August 1939, Jersey joined the Seventh Destroyer Flotilla of the Home Fleet, based at Scapa Flow in the Orkney Islands.

7 December 1939
Ten of the ship's company were killed and extensive damage caused. Jersey was towed to the Humber for repairs and did not return to her flotilla until 28 October 1940.

2 May 1941
Jersey struck an Italian aircraft-dropped mine off Malta's Grand Harbour and sank next to the Grand Harbour breakwater. Thirty-five crew members were killed.

When Jersey sank it blocked the entrance to Malta's Grand Harbour, meaning movements into and out of the harbour were impossible for several days. Some of the ships that rescued the surviving crew had to take passage to Gibraltar. On 5 May the wreck broke into two sections. It was only after 1946 that the after section was cleared from the entrance, in a series of controlled demolitions carried out between 1946 and 1949. Further salvage and clearance work was done in 1968 to make the harbour safe for large vessels.

About the wreck
 Ship sunk at: Valletta, Malta
 Position: 35° 54'N, 14° 30'E
 Depth (m.): 19 max. / 15.8 min.
 Orientation: 175°

Notes

References
 
 
 
 
 
 
 
 
 
 

 

J, K and N-class destroyers of the Royal Navy
Ships built on the Isle of Wight
1938 ships
World War II destroyers of the United Kingdom
World War II shipwrecks in the Mediterranean Sea
Maritime incidents in May 1941
Ships sunk by mines
Shipwrecks of Malta